Thompson station is a station stop in Thompson, Manitoba, Canada. The stop is served by Via Rail Canada's Winnipeg – Churchill train.

References

External links 
Via Rail Station Information

Thompson, Manitoba
Via Rail stations in Manitoba